Michel Breitman (10 August 1926 – 16 May 2009) was a French writer and translator. He won the 1986 edition of the Prix des Deux Magots with his novel Le Témoin de poussière.

A translator of Dino Buzzati, Breitman also published numerous novels, short stories and radio plays.

He wrote his first novel, Vétrino ou le bonhomme de verre directly in Italian, and when he returned to France wrote all his other works in his native tongue.

The film Fortunat, with Bourvil and Michèle Morgan was an adaptation of his eponymous novel published in 1955.

Bibliography 
1952: Carnet des Faux-Semblants, Mercure de France
1953: Vetrino, Vallechi Editore
1955: Fortunat, ou le père adopté, Éditions Denoël
1956: L'Homme aux mouettes, Denoël
1957: Le Mal de Dieu, Denoël
1958: Une lettre, Denoël
1964: Sébastien, Denoël
1970: D'exil en exil, Denoël
1985: Le Témoin de poussière, Laffont, Prix Ève Delacroix of the Académie française and Prix des Deux Magots
1995: Après la mort de l'homme, Éditions Julliard

External links 
 Michel Breitman on the site of the Académie française
 "Tempête pour le crâne de Mozart" with Michel Breitman (Tempest for the skull of Mozart)

20th-century French writers
20th-century French male writers
Italian–French translators
German–French translators
English–French translators
Prix Fénéon winners
Prix des Deux Magots winners
Prix Sainte-Beuve winners
1926 births
People from Loir-et-Cher
2009 deaths
French male non-fiction writers
20th-century French translators